Bounding Main is an American a cappella quintet focusing on traditional sea shanties and maritime music.

Formed in 2003, Bounding Main performs maritime music, presenting an "Elizabethan sea dog" look in their costumes and gear as well as informal looks that represents them as a contemporary vocal group. They perform traditional sea shanties and nautical ballads from as far back as 400 years ago, as well as new maritime music, and original compositions. Bounding Main attempts to introduce historical music and structure in a way that appeals to listeners who might otherwise consider it "old-fashioned" through the use of harmony-focused arrangements agreeable to the modern ear and attention span. The group has won awards for their performances at renaissance festivals, and they have taken several international tours, bringing their music to popular shanty festivals in locations such as Germany, Netherlands, Poland, France, England, and Canada. Their music has been preserved in the British Library's Sound Archive.

Their fan club is known as the Bounding Mainiacs.

History 
Dean Calin reached out to veteran environmental theater performers, Christie Dalby, Gina Dalby, Jon Krivitzky, and David Yondorf, inquiring if they wanted to join together to sing maritime music. The group met for rehearsal for the first time on January 19, 2003 and has performed as a quintet since 2010. Prior to that, they performed as a sextet until one of the original members retired from the group to make time for her family.

As all five performers were vocalists, and traditional sea shanties were often performed a cappella, the group decided to perform their music a cappella with minimal percussion for some songs. The group originally collaborated with instrumentalists on their first CD, Maiden Voyage, but since then have elected to mainly produce a capella tracks.

Bounding Main has performed at maritime museums, maritime music festivals, including the Chicago Maritime Festival, tall ship festivals, harbor festivals, arts festivals, pirate festivals, renaissance faires, wooden boat shows, corporate events and private parties.  Additionally, the group has performed at international music festivals in Canada and in Europe.

Bounding Main has produced six CDs:  Maiden Voyage, Lost at Sea, Going Overboard, Operation Share the Shanties, Kraken Up, and Fish Out of Water. Going Overboard was favorably reviewed in Dirty Linen magazine in 2010.

International Tours

August 2008
Bounding Main's first performance in Europe was at the Festival Maritim in Bremen-Vegesack, Germany in August 2008.  They were one of only four bands from the USA to be represented at this festival between 2002 and 2009.  Festival Maritim, which started in 1999, attracts high quality, professional bands and choirs from all over Europe and the world.

While in Germany for this festival, the group also performed at other locations in The Netherlands and Germany, most notably a charity performance to entertain US troops recovering at Landstuhl Regional Medical Center in Landstuhl, Germany.

October 2008
Six weeks later, the group embarked upon their second overseas trip, traveling to The Netherlands for the Liereliet Festival.  Based in Workum, this festival has been entertaining with authentic work songs and sailing activities since 1988.

February 2010
Bounding Main performed at the 29th International Sailors' Song Festival, "Shanties 2010" in Kraków, Poland. This popular shanty festival has become one of the most important in the world since its founding in 1981.

August 2011
In August 2011 Bounding Main again traveled to The Netherlands and performed at the 10th anniversary of the "Bie Daip International Shanty Festival" in Appingedam, Netherlands.

August 2012
Quebec, Canada, was the site of Bounding Main's next tour, where they performed at the "La Fête des chants de marins" in Saint-Jean-Port-Joli.  This festival, which attracts as many as 20,000 visitors in a year, highlights the maritime culture and local heritage of the Saint Lawrence River area.

August 2013
Paimpol, in Brittany, north-west France, was the site of Bounding Main's 2013 tour, where they performed at the "Festival du Chants de Marin de Paimpol". This event, in the French region of Brittany, brings in world-class performers from all points of the compass. The festival regularly attracts enthusiastic audiences of more than 130,000 people.

August 2014
In August 2014, Bounding Main again traveled to the Netherlands and performed at the "Bie Daip International Shanty Festival" in Appingedam, Netherlands. They then traveled to Germany to perform at the "Hafenfest Papenburg" festival in Papenburg, Germany.

August/September 2016
In August/September 2016, Bounding Main will travel to the Netherlands to perform at the "Bie Daip International Shanty Festival" in Appingedam, Netherlands. This will be the third time Bounding Main has performed at this festival. They will then travel to Germany to perform at the "Hafenfest Papenburg" festival in Papenburg, Germany. This will be their second appearance at this festival.

June 2017 
In June 2017, Bounding Main will travel to Cornwall, U.K., to perform at the Falmouth International Sea Shanty Festival in Falmouth, Cornwall, England, United Kingdom. They will then travel to the Netherlands to perform at the International Folk & Shanty Festival in Giethoorn, Netherlands. This will be the first appearance for Bounding Main at each of these festivals.

August 2019
Paimpol, in Brittany, north-west France, was the site of Bounding Main's 2019 tour, where they performed at the "Festival du Chants de Marin de Paimpol". This event, in the French region of Brittany, brings in world-class performers from all points of the compass. This was the festival's 30th anniversary, titled "Best of", and was Bounding Main's second appearance at the festival. Their music was included on the festival CD, "Festival du Chant de Marin Gouel Kan Ar Vartoloded".

February 2020
In February 2020, Bounding Main performed at the International Sailors' Song Festival, "Shanties 2020" in Kraków, Poland. This marked Bounding Main's second appearance at this popular shanty festival. Bounding Main was the recipient of the "Hat of Krakow" award. Additionally, Christie Dalby and Gina Dalby were honored with the "Figurehead 2020" award at this festival.

February 2021
In February 2021, Bounding Main was asked to participate in the 40th anniversary of the International Sailors' Song Festival, "Shanties 2021". Their music was broadcast on Friday, February 26, 2021, from Kraków, Poland.  The annual festival was moved to a virtual format in response to the COVID-19 pandemic.

Museums
Bounding Main's music has been presented at the following museums as a representation of either maritime or pirate music.
 Door County Maritime Museum - Pirates - Ship to Shore exhibit
 Wisconsin Maritime Museum - River Rendezvous, Submarine Fest 2015, Submarine Fest 2016
 Oshkosh Public Museum - Pirates Exhibit
 Kenosha History Center - Southport Lighthouse Festival
 Chicago History Museum - Chicago Maritime Festival
 Mystic Seaport museum - Neptune's Orchestra: Songs of the Seafarer exhibit
 Milwaukee Public Museum - Real Pirates exhibit

Additionally, their music is part of NRG's traveling "Treasure" exhibit.

Honors and awards
 "Renaissance Festival Podcast" Best Music Groups of 2006 (placed 4th)
 "Renaissance Festival Podcast" Best Music Groups of 2007 (placed 4th)
 "Renaissance Festival Podcast" Best Music Groups of 2008 (placed 4th)
 "Renaissance Festival Podcast" Best New CD Released in 2011 (placed 3rd for Kraken Up)
 "Renaissance Festival Awards" Stage Shows - Best Musical Group (non-comedy performance) (placed 4th); Best Comedy-Musical Show (placed 3rd) - 2013
 Constant Contact "All Star Award": 2012, 2013, and 2015
 British Library's Sound Archive: Selected by the British Library for preservation in their sound archive. Full live performance recorded at the Falmouth International Sea Shanty Festival, Falmouth, Cornwall, UK, June 2017.
 "Renaissance Festival Awards" Large Musical Acapella Stage Acts - 2019 (placed 3rd)
"Hat of Krakow" Award, Shanties 2020 Festival, Krakow, Poland, February 2020
"Figurehead 2020" Award, Shanties 2020 Festival, Krakow, Poland, February 2020
"Renaissance Festival Awards" Large Music Acapella or Instrumental Stage Act - 2021 (placed 2nd)
"Renaissance Festival Awards" Favorite A Capella Musical Stage Act - 2022 (placed 2nd)

Articles/Publications

 Profiled in Magazyn Miłośników Kultury Morza Shantyman, "Bounding Main USA", January 2020.
Profiled in Door County Pulse, "A Cappella Group Recorded by the British Library", February 9, 2018.
Profiled in Ozaukee Magazine, "5 Questions With Bounding Main", June 30, 2014.
Profiled in Door County Now, "Holiday's Lawn Concert Series kicks off", May 23, 2012.
Profiled in Weser Report, "Die Welt trifft sich in Vegesack", August 10, 2008.
Profiled in Die Norddeutsch, "Stelldichein der Shanty-Fans", August 10, 2008.
Profiled in Renaissance Magazine, "Bounding Main", August 15, 2007.
Profiled in Grayslake Times, "Off the Beaten Shore; Maritime Group Celebrates Life Through Song", February 17–23, 2006.
Profiled in On Milwaukee.com, "Bounding Main revives maritime music for a new generation", February, 2006.

Discography

Bounding Main has produced six albums:

Additionally, some of Bounding Main's songs appear on other CDs:
 "High Barbaree": Lafitte's Return Vol. 2, produced by Bob Brinkman for Pirates for the Preservation of New Orleans Music, 2007.
 "High Barbaree": Renaissance Festival Podcast Compilation CD, produced by Marc Gunn, 2008.
 "Derelict": Lafitte's Return Vol. 3, produced by Bob Brinkman for Pirates for the Preservation of New Orleans Music, 2008.
 "Blow Liza Blow": Lafitte's Return Vol. 4, produced by Bob Brinkman for Pirates for the Preservation of New Orleans Music, 2008.
 "Blow Liza Blow": Goin' Back Home Vol. 3, produced by Quickstar Productions, 2009.
 "The Day of the Clipper": Score, performed with and produced by The Jolly Rogers, 2010.
 "Dogger Bank": "Bie Daip" Appingedam 10 jaar International Shanty Festival, produced by Bie Daip International Shanty Festival, 2011.
 "Away Rio": Beg, Borrow and Steal, performed with and produced by The Jolly Rogers, 2012.
 "Sugar in the Hold": Falmouth International Sea Shanty Festival 2017 CD, produced by the Falmouth International Sea Shanty Festival, 2017.
"Sugar in the Hold": Festival du Chant de Marin Gouel Kan Ar Vartoloded (2019), produced by coop breizh, 2019.

Soundtracks

Bounding Main's music has been included in the following soundtracks:
 The Polar Sea; Documentary by The Ontario Educational Communications Authority. "Northwest Passage" from the album Lost at Sea.
 Flotsam; Short Film by Noel Goodwin (screened at London Short Film Festival). "Mingulay Boat Song" from the album Maiden Voyage.

See also
Sea shanty
A Cappella

References

External links

Bounding Main website
Preview clip of "Discover Wisconsin" featuring Bounding Main in an episode highlighting Sturgeon Bay
Document about appearance of Bounding Main on Wisconsin Public Radio show Higher Ground
Dirty Linen review of Bounding Main CD "Lost at Sea"

A cappella musical groups
Renaissance fair performers
Maritime music
Bounding Main albums
2004 albums
2011 albums